Love Is Back is the second studio album by Toby Love, released in 2008 through Sony BMG Norte. Just like his first album, he mixes bachata with R&B. He also mixes it with crunk hip hop, calling it Crunkchata. Its lead single, "Llorar Lloviendo", peaked at number 7 on the Billboard Latin Rhythm Airplay chart and number 2 on the Billboard Tropical Airplay chart.

Track listing

Charts

References

Toby Love albums
2008 albums
Spanish-language albums